Alfonso Albéniz Jordana (1 January 1886 – 27 September 1941) was a Spanish footballer who played as a midfielder for FC Barcelona and Madrid FC. He was later a diplomat and ambassador of the League of Nations and he also was one of the founders of the College of Referees of the Center, which was the first college for referees in Spain, serving as its second president, as well as the first president of the National College of Referees. He was also a director of the Chamartín club for eight years, from 1913 to 1921.

He is best known for being the first-ever player to leave FC Barcelona in order to join Madrid FC, after moving to the capital for study purposes.

Playing career 
Born in Barcelona, as the son of the composer and pianist Isaac Albéniz, Alfonso began to play football in London, where the Albéniz family settled due to the performances of his father. They returned to Barcelona when his father got ill, and that is when he joined the ranks of his hometown club FC Barcelona, which had been founded by Joan Gamper two years earlier, in 1899. At Barça, Albéniz played as a striker with a refined technique. Albéniz was a member of the Barça team that won the club's first-ever piece of silverware, the 1901–02 Copa Macaya, in which he played 5 matches and netted twice, including the opening goal in a 4–2 win over direct rivals Hispania AC on 6 January 1902. Together with Gamper, Arthur Witty and Udo Steinberg, he was a member of the Barcelona side that participated in the very first national tournament played in Spain, the 1902 Copa de la Coronación, helping Barça reach the final on 15 May 1902, where they were beaten 2–1 by Bizcaya (a combination of players from Athletic Club and Bilbao Football Club). In the semi-finals on 13 May, Albéniz went down in history as one of the eleven footballers who played in the very first El Clásico in history, which ended in a 3–1 win to Barça.

On 23 May 1902, just 10 days after featuring in FC Barcelona's line-up against Madrid FC, the press of the time announced the arrival of a 'sportsman' from Barcelona that was to join Madrid FC. Albéniz was only 16 years old and the transfer was simply for study purposes, but nonetheless, he still went down in history as the first "turncoat" of their well-known rivalry.

Together with Arthur Johnson, Pedro Parages, Federico Revuelto, Antonio Neyra, he was a member of the historic Madrid team that played in the first-ever Copa del Rey in 1903, reaching the final where they were beaten 2–3 by Athletic Club.

At the end of 1912, Albéniz featured in a friendly against Sporting Club de Irun on the occasion of the inauguration of the Campo de O'Donnell. The match itself was recorded as belonging to the 'Excelsior Cup' and ended in a draw. Local historians discovered years later that he appears as a member of the Club Stadium of Madrid between 1915 and 1918, however, very little is known about his spell with the club.

Refereeing career 
Together with the likes of Manuel Prast, José Manuel Kindelán, and Julián Ruete, he was a member of the college's first constitution on 15 April 1914. Albéniz become its president a few weeks later, on 9 May, following the resignation of Prast. The very short spell of Prast as the president is the reason why Albéniz is the one who is more often mentioned as the First President of the then National College of Referees.

Later life 
He was also a director of the Chamartín club for eight years, from 1913 to 1921.

Focused on his working life, he was a diplomat for Spain in the League of Nations. Transferred in his last years of life to Estoril, Portugal, he died there in 1941, at the age of 56, due to complications with hypertension.

He was Alberto Ruiz-Gallardon's great-uncle and grandfather of Cecila Maria Ciganer, who was Nicolas Sarkozy's ex-wife.

Honours
FC Barcelona
 Copa Macaya
 Champions: 1901-02
 Copa de la Coronación
 Runner-up: 1902

Madrid FC
 Copa del Rey
 Runner-up: 1903

References 

1886 births
1941 deaths
Spanish footballers
Association football forwards
FC Barcelona players
Real Madrid CF players
Footballers from Barcelona